The collège de Tournai was a college of the former University of Paris.

It was founded in 1353, along the collège de Boncourt, by the bishop of Tournai, on the montagne Sainte-Geneviève in the (now) 5th arrondissement of Paris. It was later attached to the collège de Navarre.

Tournai
5th arrondissement of Paris